881 Athene (prov. designation:  or ) is a stony background asteroid from the central region of the asteroid belt. It was discovered on 22 July 1917, by astronomer Max Wolf at the Heidelberg-Königstuhl State Observatory in southwest Germany. It was named after Athena, the goddess of wisdom in Greek mythology.

Orbit and classification 

Located in or near the orbital region of the Eunomia family, Athene is a non-family asteroid of the main belt's background population when applying the hierarchical clustering method to its proper orbital elements. It orbits the Sun in the central asteroid belt at a distance of 2.1–3.2 AU once every 4 years and 3 months (1,543 days; semi-major axis of 2.61 AU). Its orbit has an eccentricity of 0.21 and an inclination of 14° with respect to the ecliptic. The body's observation arc begins at Uccle Observatory on 8 August 1934, almost 17 years after its official discovery observation at Heidelberg on 22 July 1917.

Naming 

This minor planet was named after Athena or "Pallas Athene", the goddess of wisdom in Greek mythology, also known as Minerva in Roman mythology. The  was mentioned in The Names of the Minor Planets by Paul Herget in 1955. Asteroids 93 Minerva and 2 Pallas are both named after the goddess as well.

Physical characteristics 

In the Tholen-like taxonomy of the Small Solar System Objects Spectroscopic Survey (S3OS2), Athene is a common, stony S-type asteroid, while in the SDSS-based taxonomy, it is an L-type asteroid. In the SMASS-like taxonomic variant of the S3OS2, Athene is an Sl-subtype that transitions between the S-and L-type.

Rotation period 

In August 2006, a rotational lightcurve of Athene was obtained from photometric observations by Roberto Crippa and Federico Manzini at the Sozzago Astronomical Station , Italy, and by Jean-Gabriel Bosch at the Collonges Observatory , France. Lightcurve analysis gave a rotation period of  hours with a high brightness variation of  magnitude, indicative of a non-spherical, elongated shape.

Poles 

Each modeled lightcurve also determined two spin axes of (123.0°, −58.0°) and (337.0°, −47.0°), as well as (115.0°, −77.0°) and (338.0°, −43.0°) in ecliptic coordinates (λ, β).

Diameter and albedo 

The Collaborative Asteroid Lightcurve Link assumes a standard Eunomian albedo of 0.21 and calculates a diameter of 12.66 kilometers based on an absolute magnitude of 11.8.

References

External links 
 Lightcurve Database Query (LCDB), at www.minorplanet.info
 Dictionary of Minor Planet Names, Google books
 Asteroids and comets rotation curves, CdR – Geneva Observatory, Raoul Behrend
 Discovery Circumstances: Numbered Minor Planets (1)-(5000) – Minor Planet Center
 
 

000881
Discoveries by Max Wolf
Named minor planets
19170722